Pititsa is a mountain village in the municipal unit of Rio, Achaea, Greece. It is situated in the northern foothills of the Panachaiko, at about 700 m elevation. It is 2 km southeast of Sella and 11 km east of Rio. In 2011, it had a population of 26. It is known for the Pititsa hill climb, an uphill car race.

Population

See also

List of settlements in Achaea

References

Rio, Greece
Populated places in Achaea

External links
Pititsa at the GTP Travel Pages